Karyna Yezhykava (born 7 August 1990 in Gomel), is a former Belarusian female handballer. She was a player for the Belarusian national team.

Achievements
EHF Cup: 
Semifinalist: 2014

References

1990 births
Living people
Sportspeople from Gomel
Belarusian female handball players
Expatriate handball players
Belarusian expatriate sportspeople in Russia
RK Podravka Koprivnica players